Conwell Middle Magnet School is a historic middle school located in the Kensington neighborhood of Philadelphia, Pennsylvania. It is a magnet school in the School District of Philadelphia. The building was designed by Irwin T. Catharine and built in 1925–1926. It is a three-story, nine-bay, brick building on a raised basement in the Late Gothic Revival style. It features a central arched entryway with stone surround, stone two-story bay, and carved stone panels. The school was named for Temple University founder Russell Conwell.

The building was added to the National Register of Historic Places in 1988 as the Russell H. Conwell School.

References

External links

School buildings on the National Register of Historic Places in Philadelphia
Gothic Revival architecture in Pennsylvania
School buildings completed in 1926
Port Richmond, Philadelphia
Magnet schools in Pennsylvania
Public middle schools in Pennsylvania
School District of Philadelphia
1926 establishments in Pennsylvania